Horadis, is an abandoned village in the Vayk Municipality of the Vayots Dzor Province of Armenia.

Demographics 
The former inhabitants of the village emigrated from Iran in 1828–1829.

The population of Horadis since 1831 is as follows:

References

Former populated places in Vayots Dzor Province